The 2002–03 NBA season marked the return of the National Basketball Association to New Orleans. Decades after the Jazz relocated to Salt Lake City, the NBA returned to New Orleans as the New Orleans Hornets were established from the Shinn organization that once made up the Charlotte Hornets. Originally reckoned as the 15th season of the franchise, the second incarnation of the Charlotte Hornets' reclaiming the heritage of the original Hornets has since retroactively deemed this season as the inaugural season for the franchise that would eventually become the Pelicans.

During the off-season, the Hornets acquired Courtney Alexander from the Washington Wizards. The Hornets won 10 of their first 13 games, but struggled a bit down the stretch, holding a 26–24 record at the All-Star break. At midseason, the team traded center Elden Campbell to the Seattle SuperSonics in exchange for point guard Kenny Anderson, who had previously played for the Hornets back in Charlotte during the second half of the 1995–96 season. The Hornets won their final five games finishing third in the Central Division with a decent 47–35 record, and qualified for the playoffs as the #5 seed in the Eastern Conference.

Jamal Mashburn played all 82 games for the first time in his career, averaging 21.6 points, 6.1 rebounds and 5.6 assists per game. He was also voted to play in the 2003 NBA All-Star Game in Atlanta, his only All-Star appearance of his career, as he finished with 10 points as a reserve for the Eastern Conference. In addition, Baron Davis averaged 17.1 points, 6.4 assists and 1.8 steals per game, but only played just 50 games due to a left knee injury, while David Wesley provided the team with 16.7 points and 1.5 steals per game, and P.J. Brown contributed 10.7 points and 9.0 rebounds per game. Jamaal Magloire became the team's starting center, as he provided with 10.3 points, 8.8 rebounds and 1.4 blocks per game, and Alexander contributed 7.9 points per game off the bench.

A six-game defeat to Allen Iverson and the Philadelphia 76ers in the Eastern Conference First Round knocked New Orleans out of the playoffs. Following the season, head coach Paul Silas was fired, and Anderson signed as a free agent with the Indiana Pacers.

For the season, the team replaced the city name "Charlotte" with "New Orleans" on their primary logo of a hornet bouncing a basketball, and got new uniforms, adding yellow to their color scheme of teal. The uniforms remained in use until 2008.

Draft picks

The Hornets had no draft picks in 2002.

Roster

Regular season

Standings

Record vs. opponents

Game log

Playoffs
At the start of the playoffs, Baron Davis would struggle with back pain. Jamal Mashburn would suffer a dislocated finger in Game 2 of the first round series against the Philadelphia 76ers. The Hornets would force a 6th game, but Davis and Mashburn played hurt. The 76ers would eliminate the Hornets in the sixth game. After the season, the Hornets would stun their fans and most experts by firing Coach Paul Silas.

|- align="center" bgcolor="#ffcccc"
| 1
| April 20
| @ Philadelphia
| L 90–98
| Jamal Mashburn (28)
| P. J. Brown (8)
| Baron Davis (6)
| First Union Center19,711
| 0–1
|- align="center" bgcolor="#ffcccc"
| 2
| April 23
| @ Philadelphia
| L 85–90
| David Wesley (24)
| Jamaal Magloire (8)
| Jamal Mashburn (6)
| First Union Center20,229
| 0–2
|- align="center" bgcolor="#ccffcc"
| 3
| April 26
| Philadelphia
| W 99–85
| Baron Davis (28)
| P. J. Brown (12)
| Baron Davis (8)
| New Orleans Arena17,320
| 1–2
|- align="center" bgcolor="#ffcccc"
| 4
| April 28
| Philadelphia
| L 87–96
| Baron Davis (34)
| P. J. Brown (9)
| Baron Davis (7)
| New Orleans Arena16,243
| 1–3
|- align="center" bgcolor="#ccffcc"
| 5
| April 30
| @ Philadelphia
| W 93–91
| Jamal Mashburn (21)
| Jamaal Magloire (12)
| Baron Davis (10)
| First Union Center19,403
| 2–3
|- align="center" bgcolor="#ffcccc"
| 6
| May 2
| Philadelphia
| L 103–107
| Jamal Mashburn (36)
| three players tied (8)
| Baron Davis (11)
| New Orleans Arena18,570
| 2–4
|-

Player statistics

Season

Playoffs

Awards and records

Awards
Jamal Mashburn, All-NBA Third Team

Records

Transactions

Trades

Free agents

Additions

Subtractions

See also
2002–03 NBA season

References

New Orleans Hornets on Basketball Reference

New Orleans Hornets seasons